Neotettix is a genus of pygmy grasshoppers in the family Tetrigidae. There are four described species in Neotettix: all from North America.

Species
These four species belong to the genus Neotettix:
 Neotettix femoratus (Scudder, 1869) i c g b (short-leg pygmy grasshopper)
 Neotettix nullisinus (Hancock, 1919) i c g b (sinusless pygmy grasshopper)
 Neotettix proavus Rehn & Hebard, 1916 i c g b (fork-face pygmy grasshopper)
 Neotettix proteus Rehn and Hebard, 1916 i c g
Data sources: i = ITIS, c = Catalogue of Life, g = GBIF, b = Bugguide.net

References

Further reading

External links

 

Tetrigidae
Articles created by Qbugbot